Kapamüdzü, is a mountain peak in the Phek District of the Indian state of Nagaland.

Gallery

References

External links 

Geography of Nagaland
Phek district